Vincenzo "Enzo" Vattuone (born 18 April 1956) is an Italian retired professional tennis player who won a gold medal at the 1975 Mediterranean Games.

Career finals

Doubles (1 title)

References

External links
 
 

Italian male tennis players
Sportspeople from Genoa
Living people
1956 births

Mediterranean Games gold medalists for Italy
Competitors at the 1975 Mediterranean Games
Mediterranean Games medalists in tennis